The Primetime Emmy Award for Outstanding Limited or Anthology Series represents excellence in the category of limited series that are two or more episodes, with a total running time of at least 150 minutes.

Criteria
The program must tell a complete, non-recurring story, and not have an ongoing storyline or main characters in subsequent seasons.

Background
The category began as the Outstanding Drama/Comedy – Limited Episodes in 1973. Prior to that year, limited series and miniseries were entered in the same category as continuing series for Outstanding Series – Drama. According to a 1972 newspaper article in the Los Angeles Times, this change might be due to the then recent entry of a number of British produced limited series that were competing with American produced continuing series in the same pre-existing category. The category was renamed Outstanding Limited Series in 1974, and later Outstanding Miniseries in 1986.

In 1991, the Outstanding Miniseries category was merged with Outstanding TV Movie, then called Outstanding Drama/Comedy Special, to form Outstanding Drama/Comedy Special and Miniseries, and the number of nominees increased from five to six. For that year, two miniseries had competed with four "made-for-television movies". The decision was reversed in 1992. In 2011, due to a low number of eligible miniseries in recent years, the categories were again merged as Primetime Emmy Award for Outstanding Miniseries or Movie, before reverting in 2014, following an influx in limited series following the critically and commercial popularity of the FX anthology series American Horror Story. A year later, the name of the awards category was changed to Outstanding Limited Series, and the rules were made to distinguish that category from that of a movie by having the work have at least two episodes, and from that of a regular series by having no more than five episodes. The 2015 rule change allowed more short-seasoned cable TV programs to compete, while prior rules had forced the same programs to compete in the same category with full seasons network programs.

What has been unique about this award in recent years (and even so today) is that there is almost always at least one nominee originating from Great Britain. For example, the 2005 winner was The Lost Prince, which happened to be that year's British entry. The 2006 winner, Elizabeth I, was also a British miniseries, although it was a co-production with American television network HBO. Likewise, the 2019 winner, Chernobyl, was a co-production of British and American companies (in this case, Sky UK and HBO).

Winners and nominations

1970s

1980s

1990s

2000s

2010s

2020s

Programs with multiple wins

3 wins
 Prime Suspect

2 wins
 American Crime Story

Producers with multiple awards

6 awards
 Tom Hanks

5 awards
 Gary Goetzman

4 awards
 Rebecca Eaton
 Steven Shareshian

3 awards
 Stan Margulies
 Steven Spielberg
 Tony To

2 awards
 Scott Alexander
 Erik Bork
 David Coatsworth
 Brad Falchuk
 Sally Head
 Nina Jacobson
 Larry Karaszewski
 Paul Marcus
 Ryan Murphy
 Chad Oakes
 Brad Simpson
 George Stevens Jr.
 Chip Vucelich
 David L. Wolper
 Alexis Martin Woodall
 Graham Yost

Programs with multiple nominations
Totals include continuing series, but not sequels as is the case with Cranford and Return to Cranford, Roots and Roots: The Next Generations, and others.

5 nominations
 Prime Suspect

4 nominations
 American Horror Story

3 nominations
 Fargo
 Horatio Hornblower

2 nominations
 The Adams Chronicles
 American Crime
 American Crime Story
 Columbo
 Genius
 Luther
 McCloud

Producers with multiple nominations

12 nominations
 Rebecca Eaton

8 nominations
 Robert Halmi Sr.

7 nominations
 Stan Margulies
 Ryan Murphy
 Alexis Martin Woodall

6 nominations
 Brad Falchuk
 Delia Fine
 Tom Hanks
 Frank Konigsberg

5 nominations
 Gary Goetzman
 Suzanne de Passe
 Chip Vucelich
 Joan Wilson
 David L. Wolper

4 nominations
 Andrew Benson
 Bradley Buecker
 Joyce Eliason
 Suzanne Girard
 Dante Di Loreto
 Dyson Lovell
 Tim Minear
 Chad Oakes
 Steven Spielberg
 Peter Sussman
 Jac Venza

3 nominations
 Tim Bevan
 Colin Callender
 John Cameron
 Marvin J. Chomsky
 Kirk Ellis
 George S. J. Faber
 Preston Fischer
 Michael Frislev
 Ed Gernon
 Brian Grazer
 Noah Hawley
 Richard Heus
 Polly Hill
 Dirk Hoogstra
 Ron Howard
 Glenn Jordan
 Warren Littlefield
 Neil Meron
 Lorenzo Minoli
 Nina Kostroff Noble
 Alan Poul
 Jonathan Powell
 David W. Rintels
 David A. Rosemont
 John Ryan
 Jennifer Salt
 Larry Sanitsky
 Jessica Sharzer
 David Simon
 Tony To
 Kim Todd
 Michael Wearing
 Ethel Winant
 Mark M. Wolper
 James Wong
 Craig Zadan

2 nominations
 Gerald W. Abrams
 Andrew Adelson
 Scott Alexander
 Phillip Von Alvensleben
 Susan Baerwald
 Eric Bercovici
 William Beaudine Jr.
 Jay Benson
 Kenneth Biller
 Sue Birtwistle
 Erik Bork
 Richard Brams
 Andrew Brown
 Michele Buck
 Francie Calfo
 Mark Carliner
 Robert W. Christiansen
 Jack Clements
 David Coatsworth
 Fred Coe
 Ethan Coen
 Joel Coen
 Francis Ford Coppola
 Robert Costello
 Suzanne Coston
 Dan Curtis
 Edward K. Dobbs
 Nancy Dubuc
 Howard Ellis
 Laura Fattori
 Gregg Fienberg
 Bill Finnegan
 Daryl Frank
 Scott Frank
 John Frankenheimer
 Fred Fuchs
 Phillippa Giles
 Michael Gleason
 Robert Greenblatt
 Robert Halmi Jr.
 Dean Hargrove
 Andy Harries
 Kate Harwood
 John Hawkesworth
 Sally Head
 Julie Hébert
 Keith Huff
 Joseph Incaprera
 Nina Jacobson
 David Janollari
 James Cellan Jones

 Larry Karaszewski
 Virginia Kassel
 Diana Kerew
 Roland Kibbee
 Ann Kindberg
 Steven King
 Glen A. Larson
 Lindsay Law
 Stacy A. Littlejohn
 Jerry London
 Michael Mann
 Martin Manulis
 Paul Marcus
 Armistead Maupin
 Michael J. McDonald
 Ian McDougall
 John McRae
 Emilio Nunez
 Charles Pattinson
 Samuel Paul
 David V. Picker
 Noah Pink
 Susan G. Pollock
 Gigi Pritzker
 Michael Prupas
 Gerald Rafshoon
 Lynn Raynor
 Ken Riddington
 John Ridley
 Rick Rosenberg
 Nathan Ross
 Edgar J. Scherick
 Ridley Scott
 Tony Scott
 Rachel Shane
 Sam Sokolow
 Diana Son
 Carolyn Strauss
 George Stevens Jr.
 Joan Sullivan
 Lori-Etta Taub
 Kevin Tierney
 Jean-Marc Vallée
 Dan Wigutow
 Robert M. Williams Jr.
 Oprah Winfrey
 Reese Witherspoon
 Graham Yost
 David W. Zucker

Total awards by network

 HBO/HBO Max – 14
 NBC – 10
 PBS – 10
 ABC – 5
 FX – 3
 Syndicated – 2
 A&E – 1
 AMC – 1
 CBS – 1
 Netflix — 1
 Sci Fi – 1
 TNT – 1

See also
 Primetime Emmy Award for Outstanding Television Movie
 Golden Globe Award for Best Miniseries or Television Film
 TCA Award for Outstanding Achievement in Movies, Miniseries and Specials

Notes

References

Miniseries
 
Awards established in 1973